The , also known as the GEACPS, was a concept that was developed in the Empire of Japan and propagated to Asian populations which were occupied by it from 1931 to 1945, and which officially aimed at creating a self-sufficient bloc of Asian peoples and states that would be led by the Japanese and be free from the rule of Western powers. The idea was first announced on 1 August 1940 in a radio address delivered by Foreign Minister Yōsuke Matsuoka.

The intent and practical implementation of the Greater East Asia Co-Prosperity Sphere varied widely depending on the group and government department involved. Policy theorists who conceived it, as well as the vast majority of the Japanese population at large, saw it for its pan-Asian ideals of freedom and independence from Western colonial rule. In practice, however, it was frequently used by militarists and nationalists, who saw an effective policy vehicle through which to strengthen Japan's position and advance its dominance within Asia. The latter approach was reflected in a document released by Japan's Ministry of Health and Welfare, An Investigation of Global Policy with the Yamato Race as Nucleus, which laid out the central position of Japan within the Greater East Asia Co-Prosperity Sphere, and promoted the idea of Japanese superiority over other Asians. Japanese spokesmen openly described the Great East Asia Co-Prosperity as a device for the "development of the Japanese race." When World War II ended, the Greater East Asia Co-Prosperity Sphere became a source of criticism and scorn.

Development of the concept

An earlier, influential concept was the geographically smaller version of the co-prosperity sphere which was called , which was announced by Prime Minister Fumimaro Konoe on 3 November 1938 and was limited to Japan, China, and the puppet state of Manchukuo.

The original concept was an idealistic wish to liberate Asia from the rule of European colonial powers. However, some Japanese nationalists believed it could be used to gain resources which would be used to ensure that Japan would continue to be a modern power, and militarists believed that resource-rich Western colonies contained abundant supplies of raw materials which could be used to wage wars. Many Japanese nationalists were drawn to it as an ideal. Many of them remained convinced throughout the war that the Sphere was idealistic, offering slogans in a newspaper competition praising the sphere for constructive efforts and peace.

Prior to the invasion of Southeast Asia, Konoe planned the Sphere in 1940 in an attempt to create a Great East Asia, comprising Japan, Manchukuo, China, and parts of Southeast Asia, that would, according to imperial propaganda, establish a new international order seeking "co-prosperity" for Asian countries which would share prosperity and peace, free from Western colonialism and domination of the White man. Military goals of this expansion included naval operations in the Indian Ocean and the isolation of Australia. This would enable the principle of hakkō ichiu.

This was just one of a number of slogans and concepts which were used to justify Japanese aggression in East Asia from the 1930s through the end of World War II. The term "Greater East Asia Co-Prosperity Sphere" is largely remembered by Western scholars as a front for the Japanese control of occupied countries during World War II, in which puppet governments manipulated local populations and economies for the benefit of Imperial Japan.

To combat the protectionist dollar and sterling zones, Japanese economic planners called for a "yen bloc".
Japan's experiment with such financial imperialism encompassed both official and semi-official colonies. In the period between 1895 (when Japan annexed Taiwan) and 1937 (the outbreak of the Second Sino-Japanese War), monetary specialists in Tokyo directed and managed programs of coordinated monetary reforms in Taiwan, Korea, Manchuria, and the peripheral Japanese-controlled islands in the Pacific. These reforms aimed to foster a network of linked political and economic relationships. These efforts foundered in the eventual debacle of the Greater East-Asia Co-Prosperity Sphere.

History
The concept of a unified East Asia was developed by Hachirō Arita, who served as Minister for Foreign Affairs from 1936 to 1940. The Japanese Army said that the new Japanese empire was the Asian equivalent of the Monroe Doctrine, especially with the Roosevelt Corollary. The regions of Asia, it was argued, were as essential to Japan as Latin America was to the United States.

The Japanese Foreign Minister Yōsuke Matsuoka formally announced the idea of the Co-Prosperity Sphere on 1 August 1940, in a press interview, but it had existed in other forms for many years. Leaders in Japan had long had an interest in the idea. The outbreak of World War II fighting in Europe had given the Japanese an opportunity to demand the withdrawal of support from China in the name of "Asia for Asiatics", with the European powers unable to effectively retaliate. Many of the other countries within the boundaries of the sphere were under colonial rule and elements of their population were sympathetic to Japan (as in the case of Indonesia), occupied by Japan in the early phases of the war and reformed under puppet governments, or already under Japan's control at the outset (as in the case of Manchukuo). These factors helped make the formation of the sphere, while lacking any real authority or joint power, come together without much difficulty.

After Japan's advancements into French Indochina in 1940, knowing that Japan was completely dependent on other countries for natural resources, President Roosevelt ordered a trade embargo on steel and oil, raw materials that were vital to Japan's war effort. Without steel and oil imports, Japan's military could not fight for long. As a result of the embargo, Japan decided to attack the British and Dutch colonies in Southeast Asia, seizing the raw materials needed for the war effort. On 1 August 1940, Foreign Minister Matsuoka Yōsuke announced the Greater East Asia Co-prosperity Sphere; on 7 December 1941, Japan attacked Pearl Harbor; and on 19 December 1941, after the Japanese invasions of the Philippines, Malaya and the Dutch East Indies, in a radio broadcast Japanese politician Kishi Nobusuke announced the vast resources available for Japanese use in the newly conquered territories.

As part of its war drive, Japanese propaganda included phrases like "Asia for the Asiatics!" and talked about the need to liberate Asian colonies from the control of Western powers. The Japanese failure to bring the ongoing Second Sino-Japanese War to a swift conclusion was blamed in part on the lack of resources; Japanese propaganda claimed this was due to the refusal by Western powers to supply Japan's military. Although invading Japanese forces sometimes received rapturous welcomes throughout Western colonies in Asia that they had recently captured, the subsequent brutality of the Japanese military led many of the inhabitants of those regions to regard Japan as being worse than their former colonial rulers. The Japanese government directed that economies of occupied territories be managed strictly for the production of raw materials for the Japanese war effort; a cabinet member declared, "There are no restrictions. They are enemy possessions. We can take them, do anything we want". For example, according to estimates, under Japanese occupation, about 100,000 Burmese and Malay Indian laborers died while constructing the Burma-Siam Railway.

An Investigation of Global Policy with the Yamato Race as Nucleus – a secret document completed in 1943 for high-ranking government use – laid out that Japan, as the originators and strongest military power within the region, would naturally take the superior position within the Greater East Asia Co-Prosperity Sphere, with the other nations under Japan's umbrella of protection.

The booklet Read This and the War is Won—for the Japanese army—presented colonialism as an oppressive group of colonists living in luxury by burdening Asians. According to Japan, since racial ties of blood connected other Asians to the Japanese, and Asians had been weakened by colonialism, it was Japan's self-appointed role to "make men of them again" and liberate them from their Western oppressors.

According to Foreign Minister Shigenori Tōgō (in office 1941–1942 and 1945), should Japan be successful in creating this sphere, it would emerge as the leader of Eastern Asia, and the Greater East Asia Co-Prosperity Sphere would be synonymous with the Japanese Empire.

Greater East Asia Conference

The  took place in Tokyo on 5–6 November 1943: Japan hosted the heads of state of various component members of the Greater East Asia Co-Prosperity Sphere. The conference was also referred to as the Tokyo Conference. The common language used by the delegates during the conference was English. The conference was mainly used as propaganda.

At the conference Tojo greeted them with a speech praising the "spiritual essence" of Asia, as opposed to the "materialistic civilization" of the West. Their meeting was characterized by praise of solidarity and condemnation of Western colonialism but without practical plans for either economic development or integration. Because of a lack of military representatives at the conference, the conference served little military value.

With the simultaneous use of Wilsonian and Pan-Asianism rhetoric, the goals of the conference were to solidify the commitment of certain Asian countries to Japan's war effort and to improve Japan's world image; however, the representatives of the other attending countries were neither independent nor treated as equals by Japan, and as a result, Asian countries were violently used to achieve Japan's imperialist ambitions.

The following dignitaries attended:
Hideki Tojo, Prime Minister of the Empire of Japan
Zhang Jinghui, Prime Minister of the Empire of Manchuria
Wang Jingwei, President of the Republic of China (Nanjing)
Ba Maw, Head of State of the State of Burma
Subhas Chandra Bose, Head of State of the Provisional Government of Free India
José P. Laurel, President of the Republic of the Philippines
Prince Wan Waithayakon, envoy from the Kingdom of Thailand

Imperial rule
The ideology of the Japanese colonial empire, as it expanded dramatically during the war, contained two contradictory impulses. On the one hand, it preached the unity of the Greater East Asia Co-Prosperity Sphere, a coalition of Asian races, directed by Japan, against Western imperialism in Asia. This approach celebrated the spiritual values of the East in opposition to the "crass materialism" of the West. In practice, however, the Japanese installed organizationally-minded bureaucrats and engineers to run their new empire, and they believed in ideals of efficiency, modernization, and engineering solutions to social problems. Japanese was the official language of the bureaucracy in all of the areas and was taught at schools as a national language.

Japan set up puppet regimes in Manchuria and China; they vanished at the end of the war. The Imperial Army operated ruthless administrations in most of the conquered areas, but paid more favorable attention to the Dutch East Indies. The main goal was to obtain oil. The Dutch colonial government destroyed the oil wells, however, the Japanese were able to repair and reopen them within a few months of their conquest. However most of the tankers transporting oil to Japan were sunk by U.S. Navy submarines, so Japan's oil shortage became increasingly acute. Japan sponsored an Indonesian nationalist movement under Sukarno. Sukarno finally came to power in the late 1940s after several years of battling the Dutch.

Philippines
With a view of building up the economic base of the Co-Prosperity Sphere, the Japanese Army envisioned using the Philippine islands as a source of agricultural products needed by its industry. For example, Japan had a surplus of sugar from Taiwan, and a severe shortage of cotton, so they tried to grow cotton on sugar lands with disastrous results. They lacked the seeds, pesticides, and technical skills to grow cotton. Jobless farm workers flocked to the cities, where there was minimal relief and few jobs. The Japanese Army also tried using cane sugar for fuel, castor beans and copra for oil, Derris for quinine, cotton for uniforms, and abacá for rope. The plans were very difficult to implement in the face of limited skills, collapsed international markets, bad weather, and transportation shortages. The program was a failure that gave very little help to Japanese industry, and diverted resources needed for food production. As Karnow reports, Filipinos "rapidly learned as well that 'co-prosperity' meant servitude to Japan's economic requirements".

Living conditions were bad throughout the Philippines during the war. Transportation between the islands was difficult because of a lack of fuel. Food was in very short supply, with sporadic famines and epidemic diseases that killed hundreds of thousands of people. In October 1943, Japan declared the Philippines an independent republic. The Japanese-sponsored Second Philippine Republic headed by President José P. Laurel proved to be ineffective and unpopular as Japan maintained very tight controls.

Failure
The Co-Prosperity Sphere collapsed with Japan's surrender to the Allies in September 1945. Dr. Ba Maw, wartime President of Burma under the Japanese, blamed the Japanese military:

In other words, the Greater East Asia Co-Prosperity Sphere operated not for the betterment of all the Asian countries, but rather for Japan's own interests, and thus the Japanese failed to gather support in other Asian countries. Nationalist movements did appear in these Asian countries during this period and these nationalists did, to some extent, cooperate with the Japanese. However, Willard Elsbree, professor emeritus of political science at Ohio University, claims that the Japanese government and these nationalist leaders never developed "a real unity of interests between the two parties, [and] there was no overwhelming despair on the part of the Asians at Japan's defeat".

The failure of Japan to understand the goals and interests of the other countries involved in the Greater East Asia Co-Prosperity Sphere led to a weak association of countries bound to Japan only in theory and not in spirit. Dr. Ba Maw argues that Japan could have engineered a very different outcome if the Japanese had only managed to act in accord with the declared aims of "Asia for the Asiatics". He argues that if Japan had proclaimed this maxim at the beginning of the war, and if the Japanese had actually acted on that idea,

Propaganda efforts
Pamphlets were dropped by airplane on the Philippines, Malaya, North Borneo, Sarawak, Singapore, and Indonesia, urging them to join this movement. Mutual cultural societies were founded in all conquered lands to ingratiate with the natives and try to supplant English with Japanese as the commonly used language. Multi-lingual pamphlets depicted many Asians marching or working together in happy unity, with the flags of all the states and a map depicting the intended sphere. Others proclaimed that they had given independent governments to the countries they occupied, a claim undermined by the lack of power given these puppet governments.

In Thailand, a street was built to demonstrate it, to be filled with modern buildings and shops, but  of it consisted of false fronts. A network of Japanese-sponsored film production, distribution, and exhibition companies extended across the Japanese Empire and was collectively referred to as the Greater East Asian Film Sphere. These film centers mass-produced shorts, newsreels, and feature films to encourage Japanese language acquisition as well as cooperation with Japanese colonial authorities.

Projected territorial extent

Prior to the escalation of World War II to the Pacific and East Asia, the Japanese planners regarded it as self-evident that the conquests secured in Japan's earlier wars with Russia (South Sakhalin and Kwantung), Germany (South Seas Mandate) and China (Manchuria) would be retained, as well as Korea (Chōsen), Taiwan (Formosa), the recently seized additional portions of China and occupied French Indochina.

Political parties and movements with Japanese support
Azad Hind (Indian nationalist movement)
Indian Independence League (Indian nationalist movement)
Indonesian Nationalist Party (Indonesian nationalist movement)
Kapisanan ng Paglilingkod sa Bagong Pilipinas (Philippine nationalist ruling party of the Second Philippine Republic)
Kesatuan Melayu Muda (Malayan nationalist movement)
Khmer Issarak (Cambodian-Khmer nationalist group)
Dobama Asiayone (We Burmans Association) (Burmese nationalist association)

See also
Axis power negotiations on the division of Asia
Discrimination based on skin color
East Asia Development Board
Flying geese paradigm
Greater East Asia Conference (November 1943)
Greater Germanic Reich
Hachirō Arita: an Army thinker who thought up the Greater East Asian concept
Hakkō ichiu
Ikki Kita: a Japanese nationalist who developed a similar pan-Asian concept
Imperial Rule Assistance Association
Japanese nationalism
Jewish settlement in the Japanese Empire
Latin Bloc (proposed alliance)
List of East Asian leaders in the Japanese sphere of influence (1931–1945)
Ministry of Greater East Asia
Monroe Doctrine
Propaganda in Japan during the Second Sino-Japanese War and World War II
Racial Equality Proposal
Satō Nobuhiro: the alleged developer of the Greater East Asia concept

References

Citations

Further reading

Dower, John W. (1986). War Without Mercy: Race and Power in the Pacific War. New York: Pantheon Books. ; 
Fisher, Charles A. (1950) "The Expansion of Japan: A Study in Oriental Geopolitics: Part II. The Greater East Asia Co-Prosperity Sphere." The Geographical Journal (1950): 179–193.

Iriye, Akira. (1999). Pearl Harbor and the coming of the Pacific War :a Brief History with Documents and Essays. Boston: St. Martin's Press. ; 
Lebra, Joyce C. (ed.) (1975). Japan's Greater East Asia Co-Prosperity Sphere in World War II: Selected Readings and Documents. Oxford: Oxford University Press. ; 
Levine, Alan J. (1995). The Pacific War:Japan versus the allies (Greenwood Publishing Group)
Myers, Ramon Hawley and Mark R. Peattie. (1984) The Japanese Colonial Empire, 1895-1945. Princeton: Princeton University Press. 
Peattie, Mark R. (1988). "The Japanese Colonial Empire, 1895-1945," in The Cambridge History of Japan: the Twentieth Century (editor, Peter Duus). Cambridge: Cambridge University Press. 
Swan, William L. (1996) in JSTOR "Japan's Intentions for Its Greater East Asia Co-Prosperity Sphere as Indicated in Its Policy Plans for Thailand" Journal of Southeast Asian Studies 27#1 (1996) pp. 139–149
 
 
 
Ugaki, Matome. (1991). Fading Victory: The Diary of Ugaki Matome, 1941-1945. Pittsburgh: University of Pittsburgh Press. 
Vande Walle, Willy et al. The 'money doctors' from Japan: finance, imperialism, and the building of the Yen Bloc, 1894–1937 (abstract). FRIS/Katholieke Universiteit Leuven, 2007–2010.
Yellen, Jeremy A. (2019). The Greater East Asia Co-Prosperity Sphere: When Total Empire Met Total War. Ithaca: Cornell University Press.

External links

Greater East Asia Co-Prosperity Sphere at Britannica
Foreign Office Files for Japan and the Far East
WW2DB: Greater East Asia Conference

Axis powers
British Malaya in World War II
China in World War II
Hong Kong in World War II
Indonesia in World War II
Japan in World War II
Japanese colonial empire
Japanese military occupations
Japanese nationalism
Manchukuo
Military history of Japan during World War II
Pan-Asianism
Papua New Guinea in World War II
Philippines in World War II
Politics of World War II
Shōwa Statism
South Seas Mandate in World War II
Spheres of influence
Taiwan in World War II
Thailand in World War II
Vietnam in World War II